The Canisius Golden Griffins softball team represents Canisius College in NCAA Division I college softball. The team participates in the Metro Atlantic Athletic Conference (MAAC). The Golden Griffins are currently led by head coach Kim Griffin. The team plays its home games at the Demske Sports Complex located on the college's campus.

Year-by-year results

Roster
As of January 5, 2014.

See also
List of NCAA Division I softball programs

References

External links